Ratnik Za Ljubav is the fifteenth studio album by Mile Kitić. This album was supposedly his big breakthrough and the first of all albums leading up to 2005 that sold over 500,000 copies. This album sold under 1 million copies but spawned one of the greatest folk songs of ex-yu music, "Kraljica Trotoara".

Track listing 
Ratnik Za Ljubav
Tuđe, Slađe
Indija
Bosioče
Srušila Mi Dom
Zoro
Kraljica Trotoara
Svi Pevaju A Ja Tugujem 
Marija

1996 albums
Mile Kitić albums